"Hurtless" is a song by Australian singer and songwriter Dean Lewis. The song was released on 1 April 2022 as the second single from Lewis' forthcoming second studio album, The Hardest Love.

In a statement, Lewis said "You know when you plan your entire life out with someone, you see your future with that person, then all of a sudden one night, they do something and from that point on, you realise they are not the person you thought they were? All your plans for the future aren't going to happen and you're back to just being with yourself."

At the 2022 ARIA Music Awards, the song was nominated for ARIA Award for Song of the Year.

Music video
The official video was directed by James Fitzgerald, was filmed in Ireland and features actors Frank Blake and Stephanie Dufresne.

Charts

Weekly charts

Year-end charts

Certifications

References

2022 singles
2022 songs
Dean Lewis songs
Songs written by Dean Lewis
Songs written by Jon Hume